In Hinduism,  refers to the authority of the scriptures (śruti, Vedas) with regard to puruṣārtha, the objects of human pursuit, namely dharma (right conduct), artha (means of life), kāma (pleasure) and mokṣa (liberation). Together with smṛti ("that which is remembered, tradition": Dharmaśāstra, Hindu Epics, Puranas), ācāra (good custom), and ātmatuṣṭi ("what is pleasing to oneself"), it provides pramana (means of knowledge) and sources of dharma, as expressed in Classical Hindu law, philosophy, rituals and customs.

Etymology
Pramāṇa literally means "proof" and is also a concept and field of Indian philosophy. The concept is derived from the Sanskrit roots, pra, a preposition meaning "outward" or "forth", and mā which means "measurement". Pramā means "correct notion, true knowledge, basis, foundation, understand", with pramāṇa being a further nominalization of the word. Thus, the concept Pramāṇa implies that which is a "means of acquiring prama or certain, correct, true knowledge".

Shastra commonly refers to a treatise or text on a specific field of knowledge. In early Vedic literature, the word referred to any precept, rule, teaching, ritual instruction or direction. In late and post Vedic literature of Hinduism, Shastra referred to any treatise, book or instrument of teaching, any manual or compendium on any subject in any field of knowledge, including religious. It is often a suffix, added to the subject of the treatise, such as Yoga-Shastra, Nyaya-Shastra, Dharma-Shastra, Koka- or Kama-Shastra, Moksha-Shastra, Artha-Shastra, Alamkara-Shastra (rhetoric), Kavya-Shastra (poetics), Sangita-Shastra (music), Natya-Shastra (theatre & dance) and others.

With regard to sāstra pramāṇam is refers to the authority to the Vedic scriptures, as expressed in Bhagavadgita chapter 16, verse 24, where Krishna commands Arjuna to follow the authority of the scriptures:

Sruti, smriti, ācāra and ātmatuṣṭi are also the four sources of dharma in classical Hindu law, as expressed in Bhavishya Purana, Brahmaparva, Adhyaya 7:

The explanation of that sloka has been given in the digest (nibandha), bāla nibandhādarśa: there in dharma, vedas are the only chief pramāna. Smritis dissect (analyze) the essence of vedas only. Both of them support Sadācāra. Ātmasantuṣṭi that is favourable to all these is (then) dharma pramāna.

Śruti

Shruti in Sanskrit means "that which is heard" and refers to the body of most authoritative, ancient religious texts comprising the central canon of Hinduism. They are the ultimate epistemic authority or mūla pramāṇa (or prathama pramāṇa). Manusmriti states that Śrutistu vedo vigneyah (Sanskrit: श्रुतिस्तु वेदो विज्ञेय:, lit. means "Know that Vedas are Śruti"). Thus, it includes the four Vedas including its four types of embedded texts—the Samhitas, the Brāhmaṇas, the Araṇyakas and the Upaniṣads. Bhagavad Gita is also referred as Gitopaniṣad, thereby according it the status of Upanishad (i.e. Śruti), even though it is originally part of smṛti.

Vedic Sages such as Baudhayana, Parāśara, Vedavyāsa, Gautama, Vaśiṣṭha, Āpastamba, Manu, and Yājñavalkya have adhered this view in their works.

The main schools of Indian philosophy that reject the (epistemic authority of) Vedas were regarded as Nāstika, i.e. heterodox in the tradition.

Smriti

Smriti is considered as the penultimate epistemic authority or dvitīya pramāṇa. Smriti literally means "that which is remembered" and it a body of Hindu texts usually attributed to an author, traditionally written down, in contrast to Śrutis (the Vedic literature) considered authorless, that were transmitted verbally across the generations and fixed. Smriti is a derivative secondary work and is considered less authoritative than Sruti in Hinduism, except in the Mimamsa school of Hindu philosophy. The authority of smriti accepted by orthodox schools, is derived from that of shruti, on which it is based.

The Smrti literature is a corpus of diverse varied texts. This corpus includes, but is not limited to the six Vedāngas (the auxiliary sciences in the Vedas), the Itihasas (i.e. the Mahābhārata and Rāmāyana), the Dharmasūtras and Dharmaśāstras (or Smritiśāstras), the Arthasaśāstras, the Purānas, the Kāvya or poetical literature, extensive Bhasyas (reviews and commentaries on Shrutis and non-Shruti texts), and numerous Nibandhas (digests) covering politics, ethics (Nitisastras), culture, arts and society.

Each Smriti text exists in many versions, with many different readings. Smritis were considered fluid and freely rewritten by anyone in ancient and medieval Hindu tradition.

The authors of 18 smritis are namely, Atri, Viṣṇu, Hārīta, Auśanasī, Āngirasa, Yama, Āpastamba, Samvartta, Kātyāyana, Bṛhaspati, Parāśara, Vyāsa, Śaṅkha, Likhita, Dakṣa, Gautama, Śātātapa and Vaśiṣṭha. Yājñavalkya gives the list of total 20 by adding two more Smritis, namely, Yājñavalkya and Manu. Parāśara whose name appears in this list, enumerates also twenty authors, but instead of Samvartta, Bṛhaspati, and Vyāsa, he gives the names of Kaśyapa, Bhṛgu and Prachetas.

Purāṇas
Āpastamba and Vyasa considers the purāṇas as antepenultimate epistemic authority or tṛtīya pramāṇa. In Āpastambasmṛti, it has been mentioned as

Vyāsasmṛti (verse 1.5) state that

Ācāra

Ācāra, also siṣṭāchāra or sadāchara, is a concept used in the context of Classical Hindu law that refers to the customary laws or community norms of a particular social group. These community norms are delineated and put into practice by people who have earned the respect of those within each individual group, such as a community leader or elder. Although in Dharmaśāstra the ideal person who defines the ācāra of a particular place is dictated as one who knows the Vedas or is “learned”, in actual practice this role is often deferred to group leaders along with Vedic scholars. Ācāra is theologically important in classical Hindu law because it is considered, along with the Vedas (Śruti), and Smriti (traditional texts such as the Dharmaśāstra literature), to be one of the sources of dharma. Particular regional ācāra is believed to be canonized in Dharmaśāstra texts; however scholars differ on the source for the actual accounts found within these texts.

The Anuśāsana-parva of the Mahabharatastates:
{{blockquote|
Those who have the 'desire to know dharma' (dharma jijñāsa), the first pramāṇa is śruti.The second pramāṇa are the dharmaśāstras (i.e. the dharma part of smṛti). The third reference is as per the custom of the people.}}

To Parāśara, Manu, Yājñavalkya, Vaśiṣṭha and Baudhayana, the virtuous conduct of Śiṣṭas (virtuous learned men) and practice of good men, Sadāchara is the antepenultimate epistemic authority or tṛtīya pramāṇa after Śrutis and Smṛtis. Vaśiṣṭhasmṛti verse 1.4 quotes, tadalabhe śiṣṭāchārah pramāṇam, i.e. only if the relevant references are absent in those both, then Śiṣṭa Āchāra can be considered as Antepenultimate pramāṇa. According to the sage Vaśiṣṭha, Śruti and Smṛti are more important sources than others. The Padma Purana also prescribes as similar view.

While citing Śiṣṭāgama (lit. that which has come down from Śiṣṭas) as the antepenultimate authority after Vedas and smirtis by Baudhayana in his smriti (verse 1.5), the Śiṣṭas are defined thus:-Sistas (indeed are those) who are free from envy (vigatamatsarāḥ), free from pride (nirahankārāḥ), contented with a store of grain sufficient for ten days (kumbhīdhānyāḥ), free from covetousness (alolupāḥ), and free from hypocrisy (damba), arrogance (darpa), greed (lobha), perplexity (confusion) and anger (krodha).

Kumarila Bhatta, prominent Mīmāṃsā scholar from early medieval India states in his Tantravartika:

 Ātmatuṣṭi Ātmatuṣṭi is usually translated into English as being "what is pleasing to oneself." The first three sources of law are rooted in the vedas, whereas Ātmatuṣṭi is not. It is because of this that Ātmatuṣṭi, as a fourth source (i.e. caturtha pramāṇa), is not recognized by most scholars due to the lack of legitimacy. Only Manu and Yājñavalkya refer to Ātmatuṣṭi as the fourth source of dharma within the Hindu Law tradition. Textual accounts of Manu's and Yajnavalkya's placement of Ātmatuṣṭi as a fourth source of dharma can be found in The Law Code of Manu 2.6 and The Law Code of Yajnavalkya 1.7. Yājñavalkya goes further step adding good intent (samyaksaṃkalpa) as additional fifth source of Dharma:

Later, samyaksaṃkalpa (Pali: sammā saṅkappa) was included among the Noble Eightfold Path (āryāṣṭāṅgamārga) putforth by Gautama Buddha.

Instances of conflict
Conflict between different epistemic sources, generally termed as virodha. When there is an instance of conflict between the smriti and the śruti, the śruti shall prevail.
Similarly, Whenever there is conflict between different epistemic sources in general, then as per Āpastamba, it is advised to refer more preceding epistemic sources as they hold more authority. In Āpastambasmṛti, it is mentioned as

Vedavyasa also holds a similar view in his vyāsasmṛti, verse 1.4

Prasthanatrayi

The Prasthanatrayi (Sanskrit: प्रस्थानत्रयी, IAST: Prasthānatrayī) are the three canonical texts of Hindu theology having epistemic authority, especially of the Vedanta schools, namely the Upanishads, the Brahma Sutras, and the Bhagavad Gita. Prasthanatrayi can viewed as subset of Hindu epistemic sources. Vedanta is also known as Uttara Mīmāṃsā is one of the six (āstika) schools of Hindu philosophy. These six schools are traditionally referred as shad-darśanas as they give their own points of view on the Hindu scriptures. Vedānta school is based on Brahma Sūtras (Sanskrit: ब्रह्म सूत्र) of Bādarāyana. Adi Sankara who propagated Advaita has established the concept of Prasthanatrayi, the epistemic references based on Śāstra pramāṇam in Hinduism. Along with Brahma sutras, upanishads are considered from Vedas and Bhagavad gita is chosen from Mahabharata, which is Itihasa (i.e. part of smriti). The same has been accepted by all other acharyas of other vedanta schools such as Ramanuja, Madhwa, etc.

Modern usage and criticism
Śāstra pramāṇam has been used by social reformers for 19th century from Bengal such as Ishwar Chandra Vidyasagar. He was the most prominent campaigner for widow remarriage and was supported in this by many wise and elite gentlemen of the society and the first signatory on his application to the then Governor General was Shri Kasinath Dutta, belonging to the Hatkhola Dutta lineage. He petitioned in legislative council and was responsible for Hindu Widows' Remarriage Act, 1856. In the same century, Similar effort from south India was carried by social reformers such as Kandukuri Veeresalingam pantulu and Gurazada Apparao to eradicate social evils.

Baba Saheb Ambedkar has criticized the rigidity of śāstra pramāṇam in Hinduism in his work Annihilation of Caste by attacking especially on Manusmriti. In order to prevent child marriages among Hindus, The Child Marriage Restraint Act was passed in 1929. Śāstra pramāṇam was considered by Hindu pandits appointed by the age of consent committee to fix the age of marriage of girl child and then it was fixed to be 14 later by Sarda Act.

See also
 Pramana	
 Prasthanatrayi
 Āstika and nāstika
 Dharma (Buddhism)

References

Notes

Sources

 Davis, Jr. Donald R. Forthcoming. Spirit of Hindu Law 

Further reading
 Domenico Francavilla (2006), The roots of hindu jurisprudence: sources of Dharma and interpretation in Mīmāṃsā and Dharmaśāstra''

External links
 Schools of Jurisprudence – Concept of Dharma

Hindu law
 
Hindu philosophical concepts
Hinduism